The Saint Peter's Peacocks men's basketball team is the basketball team that represents Saint Peter's University in Jersey City, New Jersey. The school's team currently competes in the Metro Atlantic Athletic Conference and is currently led by first-year head coach Bashir Mason, who was hired on April 12, 2022.

History
In 2022 they gained national recognition, becoming the tenth No. 15 seed in history to upset a No. 2 seed after knocking off the Kentucky Wildcats. Beating Murray State in the next round, they became the third No. 15 seed in tournament history (and the third in the last nine years) to make the Sweet 16. To conclude their historic run, they upset Purdue to become the first No. 15 seed in tournament history to advance to the Elite Eight.

Postseason results

NCAA tournament results
Saint Peter's has appeared in the NCAA Tournament four times, with the Peacocks having a record of 3–4.

NIT results
Saint Peter's has appeared in the National Invitation Tournament (NIT) twelve times, with the Peacocks having a record of 5–12.

CIT results
Saint Peter's has appeared in the CollegeInsider.com Postseason Tournament (CIT) once, which they won in 2017.

References

External links